GRES may refer to:

 GRES (power station), a Russian term referring to a condenser type electricity-only thermal power station
 Grêmio Recreativo Escola de Samba (Recreative Guild Samba School), an acronym used by Brazilian Samba schools

See also
 Grès (disambiguation)